Long Weekend (released on video in the U.S. as Nature's Grave) is a 2008 Australian psychological horror film and the remake of the 1978 Australian film Long Weekend. It was directed by Jamie Blanks.

Plot
Peter and Carla have a wasted marriage and constant friction. Peter buys expensive camping gear and, despite the protests of Carla, insists they travel with their dog Cricket to camp on the isolated Moondah Beach in the North Coast with his friend Luke and his girlfriend during the rainy holiday. Peter stops in a pub at the Eggleston Hotel and leaves a message for Luke with the owner of the pub. When Peter takes what he believes to be a shortcut to the beach, he gets lost and the couple spends the night sleeping in their SUV. The next morning, Peter organizes the campsite and their intrusion into and abuse of the natural environment begins. During the two days, the couple's relationship deteriorates while nature avenges the bad treatment the couple has inflicted upon it.

Cast
 James Caviezel as Peter 
 Claudia Karvan as Carla
 Robert Taylor as Bartender
 Roger Ward as Truckie

Release

The film was released on 9 October 2008 in Spain to the Sitges International Fantastic Film Festival, and featured at the Edinburgh International Film Festival 2009.

Reception

The remake of Long Weekend has a 0% approval rating on Rotten Tomatoes based on 6 reviews.

References

External links 
 
Long Weekend at Oz Movies

2008 films
2008 horror films
Australian natural horror films
Remakes of Australian films
Australian horror drama films
Australian horror thriller films
Films set in New South Wales
Films directed by Jamie Blanks
2000s English-language films
2000s Australian films